Rahul Bajaj (10 June 1938 – 12 February 2022) was an Indian billionaire businessman. He was the chairman emeritus of the Indian conglomerate Bajaj Group. He was awarded the third-highest civilian award in India, the Padma Bhushan, in 2001.

Early life
Bajaj was born on 10 June 1938, to Kamalnayan Bajaj and Savitri Bajaj. He was the grandson of Indian independence fighter, Jamnalal Bajaj, who was a close associate of Mahatma Gandhi. Bajaj was an alumnus of Harvard Business School in the US, St. Stephen's College, Delhi, Government Law College, Mumbai and Cathedral and John Connon School.

Career

Bajaj took over the Bajaj Group in 1965.

Bajaj stepped down from his role in 2005 and his son Rajiv became the Group's managing director. Bajaj led the split of Bajaj Auto into three units in 2008: Bajaj Auto, Bajaj Finserv and a holding company. He resigned as chairman and non-executive director of Bajaj Finserv to become chairman emeritus in March 2019. In April 2021, Bajaj stepped down as non-executive chairman of Bajaj Auto, ceding the position to his cousin, Niraj Bajaj, and remained with the company as chairman emeritus.

Bajaj was elected to the Rajya Sabha, India's Upper House of Parliament, filling the seat vacated by the death of Pramod Mahajan for the 2006–2010 period.

Bajaj was elected as the president of the Confederation of Indian Industry (CII) twice, in 1979–1980 and 1999–2000. For his outstanding work to the Indian industry, the then President of India, Pranab Mukherjee, presented him with CII President's Award for Lifetime Achievement in 2017.

Some of the other positions that Bajaj held included chairman of Indian Airlines, chairman of the International Business Council at the World Economic Forum, chairman of the board at Indian Institute of Technology Bombay, member of the International Advisory Council at the Brookings Institution, and a member of the South Asia advisory board at Harvard Business School.

Bajaj received the Padma Bhushan, India's third-highest civilian honor, in 2001.

On the Forbes, 2016 list of the world's billionaires, he was ranked No. 722, with a net worth of US$2.4 billion.

Personal life and death
His sons Rajiv Bajaj and Sanjiv Bajaj are involved in the management of his companies. His daughter Sunaina is married to Manish Kejriwal, the former head of Temasek India.

Bajaj died from pneumonia on 12 February 2022, at the age of 83. He was earlier admitted to the Ruby Hall Clinic in Pune, and was undergoing treatment at the hospital. He also had cancer and heart problem prior to his death.

References

Further reading

External links 
 

1938 births
2022 deaths
Bajaj Auto executives
Rahul
Bajaj Group
Businesspeople from Mumbai
Cathedral and John Connon School alumni
Deaths from pneumonia in India
Delhi University alumni
Harvard Business School alumni
Indian billionaires
Indian expatriates in the United States
Marwari people
Rajya Sabha members from Maharashtra
Recipients of the Padma Bhushan in trade and industry